The Montreal–Jonquière train (formerly the Saguenay) is a passenger train operated by Via Rail between Montreal and Saguenay (borough of Jonquière) in Quebec, Canada. The train once operated as far as Chicoutimi.

The journey, from end to end, theoretically takes approximately 11 hours, but it is very rarely on time and can easily take up to 13 hours. Many small hunting and fishing clubs operate along the route and appear as optional stops on the timetable. It is also possible to make a reservation to get off at an unmarked spot.

The train travels three times a week. Between Montreal and Hervey-Jonction, it travels together with the Montreal–Senneterre, another regional train.

Route
The main stops of Montreal–Jonquière train are:
Montreal (Central Station)
Joliette
Shawinigan
Hervey-Jonction (connection to the Montreal–Senneterre train)
Rivière-à-Pierre
Lac-Édouard
Chambord
Hébertville-Station (near Alma)
Jonquière (in Saguenay)

References

External links
  Via Rail Canada – Montreal–Jonquière train

Passenger rail transport in Quebec
Via Rail routes